Astragalus arenarius, the sand milk-vetch or sand milkvetch, is a species of milkvetch mostly found in Central and Eastern Europe, with populations in Russia stretching perhaps as far as the Urals, and a few instances in Sweden, Finland, and perhaps Denmark. The center of diversity appears to be in Central Russia. Its chromosome number is 2n=16.

Description
The somewhat recumbent A. arenarius has slender branched stems from 10 to 40cm long, and typically reaches30 cm tall. It can be distinguished from its congeners by its having leaflets grouped in 2 to 6 pairs, 2 to 4mm wide by 10 to 20mm long; calyces that are characterized by having mostly strongly asymmetric bifurcate hairs; a standard (the large posterior petal seen in legume flowers) 15 to 17mm long; and legumes that 12 to 20 mmlong. Its petals range in color from light purple to lilac, and rarely can be white. The flowering time is from June to July.

Ecology

As the specific name implies it grows in sandy or gravelly areas, in places that have limited competition from grasses, such as sandy open pine woodlands, dunes, river banks, roadsides and railway embankments. The larvae of the moth species Coleophora gallipennella, C.onobrychiella, C.polonicella and Syncopacma albifrontella feed on A.arenarius.

References

arenarius
Flora of Central Europe
Flora of Eastern Europe
Flora of Northern Europe
Taxa named by Carl Linnaeus
Plants described in 1753